Grønn is a surname of Norwegian origin, cognate to the English-language surname Green. People with that name include:

 Birger Grønn (1898-1988), Norwegian engineer
 Hans Finne-Grønn (1903-2001), Norwegian painter
 Jørgen Finne-Grønn (1905-1998), Norwegian diplomat
 Karen Grønn-Hagen (1903-1982), Norwegian politician
 Ole Henrik Grønn (born 1984), Norwegian politician
 Stian Herlofsen Finne-Grønn (1869-1963), Norwegian lawyer, archivist, genealogist and museum director

Or the word "Grønn" could just refer to the colour green itself.

See also
 Grønning (disambiguation)
 

Surnames of Norwegian origin